The 3rd Wish: To Rock the World sometimes just called The 3rd Wish is the fourth solo studio album by American hip hop recording artist SPM. It was released on November 23, 1999 via Dope House Records.

Local success
The 3rd Wish was a Houston area hit, with the single "High So High" gaining much local buzz and even charting at #50 on the Billboard Hot Rap Tracks chart. The 3rd Wish is Coy's first album to chart, peaking at #89 on the Top R&B/Hip-Hop Albums with 60,000 copies sold in the first week released. This eventually lead to SPM signing a joint venture between his label and Universal Music Group in 2000 which earned him a $500,000 advance and national distribution.

Reception

"Rapper SPM acknowledges a past as a drug dealer, and that former occupation continues to inform his approach to his current career, from the name of his record label, Dope House, to the subject matter of his raps. His is a world of crime and retribution, expressed in language laced with the usual epithets and expletives. The raps are slower and more deliberate, the music more melodic than most other rap, and there are occasional surprises. 'Land of The Lost' is a melodramatic narrative that looks back with regret, while 'Miss Perfect' is a love rap, an unabashed tribute to SPM's wife. Like other rap label heads, the artist uses his own albums to introduce other rappers on his label. In fact, the album is basically a label sampler, featuring 23 rappers and groups in addition to SPM himself and containing tracks from upcoming Dope House releases. Four of the 16 tracks don't even feature the artist. Nevertheless, he remains the most distinctive presence on the album, and his perspective, while including much of the standard-issue opinions and expressions of the genre, is individual enough to be distinctive." ~ William Ruhlman

Track listing

Chart history

References

External links

1999 albums
South Park Mexican albums
Albums produced by Happy Perez